Davudi-ye Sofla (also Romanized as Dāvūdī-ye Soflá; also known as Dāvūdī-ye Pā'īn) is a village in Howmeh Rural District, in the Central District of Harsin County, Kermanshah Province, Iran. At the 2006 census, its population was 68, in 14 families.

References 

Populated places in Harsin County